Chamkar Leu may refer to:

Chamkar Leu District, a district of Kampong Cham province, Cambodia
Chamkar Leu (town), the district capital of Chamkar Leu District